Rubery Owen is a British engineering company which was founded in 1884 in Darlaston, West Midlands.

History
In 1884 the company was started by John Tunner Rubery (1849-1920) and his two brothers (Samuel 1844-1910 and Thomas William 1856-1925), as an ironworks manufacturing gates and fences.  In 1893 trained engineer Alfred Ernest Owen joined John Rubery, replacing his two brothers, and in 1903 the company name of Rubery Owen was established.

When John Rubery retired in 1910, the partnership was bought out by Owen and by 1912 the company had expanded into aviation engineering, motor frames and roofing, in addition to fencing manufacture.

The company expanded during the 1920s and 1930s to include the production of metal airframes, metal storage equipment, steel pulleys and armour plate.  They also acquired a Warrington hydraulic company Conveyancer Fork Trucks Ltd which became Rubery Owen Conveyancer, and which claims to have launched the UK's first forklift truck in 1946.

During World War II they concentrated on supporting the war effort, producing parts for military aircraft, and Brodie helmets.

Bolt (fastener)#bolt heads of early post-war Rubery Owen production were marked simply with "RO", and then "Rubery Owen" was spelled out; these bolts made their way to any number of British factories building motor-vehicles, from automobiles to motorcycles. At the same time the company widened its range to include other engineering compoments for industry, including ploughs for Ferguson Tractors, metal pressings, fasteners, motor vehicle components and structural steel components for the building industry.

In 1950 the company became a member of the new holding company, the "Owen Organisation", under the same ownership. In 1956 they were designing and manufacturing aircraft landing gear. There was a large test rig where the wheel assembly was held, the wheel spun up to the equivalent landing speed and then dropped onto the "ground" to simulate the landing process. Measuring equipment recorded the stresses.

In the 1960s and 1970s Rubery Owen supplied many components and parts to the British motor industry but the most recognised is the Rostyle wheel (the word 'Rostyle' being a contraction of RO-Style). These were distinctive steel disc wheels pressed to a shape to give the effect of spokes. Rostyle wheels were common on British cars of the period both as manufacturer fitted options and aftermarket accessories.

In 1977 Coventry Climax acquired the Warrington forklift truck business of Rubery Owen Conveyancer.
 
In 1981 the main Darlaston works closed down.

Rubery Owen is now managed by David Owen, and co run by Jim Owen. David Owen recently sold the building for £1 to Walsall Housing Regeneration Agency (WHRA), a local charity who offers numerous projects based in Darlaston and surrounding areas. David and a small team are still based within Rubery Owen.

The Owen Group of Companies 1965
England
Rubery, Owen & Co—Darlaston—Coventry—West Bromwich—Wolverhampton—Prees—Pensnett—Willenhall—Moxley—Bourne
Bentley Hall Brick Co—Walsall
 Bowser International—London
W Brealey & Co—Sheffield
The Brooke Tool Mfg Co—Birmingham
Brooke Tool Automation—Birmingham
T S Harrison & Sons—Heckmondwike
Boxford Machine Tools—Halifax
Fred Whiteley—Halifax
Steel Fabrications (Halifax)—Halifax
E Camelinat & Co—Birmingham
The Castra Electric Washing Machine Co—Rodley—Leeds
Chains—Wednesbury
Charles Clark & Son—Wolverhampton
Bull Stake Motors (Darlaston)—Darlaston
Charles Clark (Stafford)—Stafford
Charles Clark & Son (Commercial Vehicles)—Wolverhampton
Esiclene Porcelain-Enamel (1938)—Wolverhampton
Electro-Hydraulics—Warrington
Conveyancer Fork Trucks—Warrington
Conveyancer-Scott Electric Vehicles—Warrington
Conveyancer-Raymond—Warrington
Gasel Appliances—Darlaston
Gasel—Oakengates
Joseph Gillott & Sons—Sheffield
(Proprietors Cardinal Steels)
Gillotts Forge and Rolling Mills—Sheffield
W Gwennap (Agricultural)—Stafford
C & L Hill—Willenhall
C & L Hill (Diecastings)—Willenhall
Hill-Alzen (Sales)—Willenhall
Central Patternmaking Co—Willenhall
Hudson Brown–Oldbury
Invicta Electrodes—Willenhall
Leabank Office Equipment—London
Motor Panels (Coventry)—Coventry
Nuts & Bolts (Darlaston)—Darlaston
J Stanley & Co—Wednesbury
Owen Kleine Structures—Darlaston
Shuker & Son (Shrewsbury—Shrewsbury
J W Baker & Co—Darlaston
A Warden & Co—London
Rubery, Owen Kepston—Pensnett
Rubery, Owen (Warrington)—Warrington
Rubery, Owen Drott—London
Salopian Engineers—Prees Salop
Salopian Kenneth Hudson—Prees Salop
Shorrock Superchargers—Wednesbury
A G Sutherland—Birmingham
H T Developments—Birmingham
J B Williams (Maxstoke)—Birmingham

Scotland
Rubery, Owen & Co—Cumbernauld
William Donaldson (Engineers)—Paisley

Wales
Rubery, Owen & Co—Wrexham
Rogers & Jackson—Wrexham
R & J Wrexham (Wholesale)—Wrexham
J E Brassey & Son—Wrexham
E Camelinat & Co—Dowlais
Nuts & Bolts (Darlaston)—Tredegar

Australia
Rubery, Owen & Kemsley Pty—Finsbury SA—Moorabbin Vic.
Conveyancer Fork Trucks (Australia) Pty—Rosebery NSW

South Africa
Ruberowen (South Africa)—Vanderbijlpark Transvaal
Ruberowen Metal Pressings—Roodeport Transvaal—Port Elizabeth Cape Province
Rubery, Owen & Scott (S.A.)—Durban

India
Mahindra Owen—Bombay

Canada
Rubery Owen, Canada—Toronto

References

External links
Upstairs/Downstairs At The Factory - Time Magazine article
Rubery Owen- Company website
Rubery Owen History - Rozone Ltd
Catalogue of the Rubery Owen Holdings Ltd archives, held at the Modern Records Centre, University of Warwick
Catalogue of the Rubery Owen (Darlaston) Ltd archives, held at the Modern Records Centre, University of Warwick

Engineering companies of the United Kingdom
Science and technology in the United Kingdom
Companies based in the West Midlands (county)
Walsall
Former defence companies of the United Kingdom
United Kingdom in World War II